Menkeøyane is a small Norwegian island group south of Halvmåneøya, an island off the southeast coast of Edgeøya. The group includes Havella, Alka, Gassen, Teisten, Islomen and Blåmåken. They comprise part of Thousand Islands. The islands are named after the German cartographer and historical geographer Heinrich Theodor Menke (1819–92). The islands appear on the Muscovy Company's map (1625), one of which is labeled Heling I.

References

 Norwegian Polar Institute Place Names of Svalbard Database
Purchas, S. 1625. Hakluytus Posthumus or Purchas His Pilgrimes: Contayning a History of the World in Sea Voyages and Lande Travells by Englishmen and others. Volumes XIII and XIV (Reprint 1906 J. Maclehose and sons).

Islands of Svalbard